Ice kenkey is a popular Ghanaian dessert made from kenkey, a steamed dumpling made from fermented cornmeal. It is often sold as a street food in Ghana.

Description
Kenkey is produced by steeping grains of maize in water for about two days, before they are then milled and kneaded into a dough. The dough is allowed to ferment for a few days, before part of the dough is cooked and then mixed with uncooked dough. Ice kenkey is produced by breaking kenkey into pieces, milling it, and then mixed with water, sugar, powdered milk, and ice. Some producers use roasted groundnuts instead of milk.

Hygiene
Ice kenkey sold by street food vendors in Ghana is prone to E. coli and Staphylococcus aureus contamination due to manual operations and poor hygienic practices in the production process, as well as a lack of pasteurization. Municipal authorities have implemented an ice kenkey production training manual and created task forces to ensure food safety.

References 

African cuisine
Ghanaian cuisine
Frozen desserts
Street food